Veľký Rozsutec (1,609.7 m; 5,281.17 ft AMSL) is a mountain situated in the Malá Fatra mountain range in the Žilina Region, Slovakia. The peak is situated in the north part of Malá Fatra called Krivánska Malá Fatra and is part of the Malá Fatra National Park and Rozsutec National Nature Reserve (since 1967).

Veľký Rozsutec and the surrounding area are home to many endangered species of plants and animals, some of which are endemic, as well as rare karst terrain.

Photogallery

External links

 Rozsutec National Nature Reserve at the State Inventory of Specially Protected Parts of Nature and Landscape
 3D panorama from top 20.9.2007

Mountains of Slovakia
Mountains of the Western Carpathians